LIPH may refer to:

 LIPH (gene), an enzyme that in humans is encoded by the LIPH gene
 LIPH, the ICAO code for Treviso Airport, Italy